Sallajaque (possibly from Aymara salla rock, cliff, jaqhi cliff, "rock cliff") is a mountain in the Andes of southern  Peru, about  high. It is situated in the Tacna Region, Candarave Province, on the border of the districts Camilaca and Candarave. Sallajaque lies south-west of the volcano Tutupaca and west of the mountain Huilacollo.

References

Mountains of Peru
Mountains of Tacna Region